Frank Jesse Hopkins (30 June 1875 – 15 January 1930) was an English cricketer. Hopkins was a left-handed batsman who bowled left-arm medium pace.

Hopkins made his first-class debut for Warwickshire in the 1898 County Championship against Lancashire. Hopkins played nine matches for Warwickshire in the 1898 season. During the season, Hopkins who was a bowler took 24 wickets at a bowling average of 29.91, with best figures of 5–10 against Kent.

Hopkins played just two more matches for Warwickshire after the 1898 season, with a single match against Essex in 1900 and Hopkins final match for the county in 1903 against Surrey.

In 1904 Hopkins moved to Hampshire and after qualifying for the county, Hopkins represented it in the 1906 County Championship, Hopkins made his debut for Hampshire against Surrey. Hopkins played one further match in 1906 for Hampshire, which came against Yorkshire.

Hopkins next and final first-class match came in 1911, when Hampshire played Lancashire.

Hopkins was renowned as one of the best groundsmen in the country and worked as a groundsman at the County Ground, Southampton.

Hopkins died at Southampton, Hampshire on 15 January 1930.

References

External links
Frank Hopkins at Cricinfo
Frank Hopkins at CricketArchive

1875 births
1930 deaths
People from Kings Norton
English cricketers
Warwickshire cricketers
Hampshire cricketers